Robert Prévost,  (1927–1982) was a Canadian set designer.

He designed sets for Canada's major stage productions, including the Stratford Festival, Les Grands Ballets Canadiens and the Royal Winnipeg Ballet.

In 1972, he was made a Member of the Order of Canada and was promoted to Officer in 1978.

External links
 Fonds D'Archives Robert Prévost 

1927 births
1982 deaths
Officers of the Order of Canada
People from Montreal
Canadian scenic designers
Canadian theatre designers